Screamin' with the Deadguy Quintet is the final extended play by American metalcore band Deadguy, which was released on compact disc, compact cassette, and 10" vinyl formats through Victory Records on December 3, 1996. It is the only recording by the group to not feature vocalist Tim Singer and guitarist Keith Huckins, and has been noted on showing a shift in style for the band.

Pre-production for the recording began shortly after the band's 1995 tour, which resulted in line-up changes due to personal tensions between members. Most tracks on the disc were written in the home of Jim Baglino, guitarist of Human Remains. Beglino would then join the band as their bassist, as their original bassist Tim Naumann became their vocalist. The band hired Steve Austin, frontman of Today Is the Day, to record and produce the record. The album's name is a reference to the Miles Davis album Steamin' With the Miles Davis Quintet.

Track listing

Personnel
Jim Baglino - bass
Dave Rosenburg - drums
Tom Yak - guitar
Tim "Pops" Naumann - vocals
Chris "Crispy" Corvino - guitar, vocals
Dave - artwork
Tom B - artwork
Rick Deardof - engineering
Steve Austin - production, engineering

References

External links
 

Deadguy albums
1996 albums